Scott Conley may refer to:

 Scott Conley (American football) (born 1947), American football coach
 Scott Conley (rugby league) (born 1973), Australian rugby league footballer who played in the 1990s